Klaus Henkes (29 July 1929, in Görlitz – 7 March 2003) was a German soldier.

He was a Generalleutnant in the East German army (NVA) and a deputy Transport minister in the government from 1975 till 1990.   Between 1978 and 1982 he was in charge of Interflug, the national airline of East Germany.

Biography

Early years
Henkes was born into a working-class family in Görlitz where after leaving school relatively young he studied for a career as a chemical laboratory assistant.   At the end of the war he was captured by the Soviets and was, according to one source, a Soviet prisoner of war between 1946 and 1949.   He trained as a miner of Lignite (brown coal) at Espenhain (near Leipzig) and, in 1948, became a member of East Germany's ruling Socialist Unity Party of Germany (SED / "Sozialistische Einheitspartei Deutschlands").   By 1949 he had already reached the rank of Brigadier with SAG Wismut, the important (Uranium) mining company.

A period of further education followed  when he studied at the Freiberg Mining Academy from 1949 till 1950, after which he returned to Wismut, where he worked till 1952.

Military training
Henkes volunteered for military service on 23 May 1952, and was commended to attend "Lehrgang X" training till 1953.   This was a training programme instigated at the end of 1951 by the Soviet authorities which involved special training at Syzran, by the Volga River for approximately 220 East German future military pilots for that country's future military air force.   (The country's army was only officially designed an army in 1956, prior to which quasi-military activity took place under the auspices of the Peoples' Police based in Barracks (KVP / Kasernierte Volkspolizei).)

After completing his training he was appointed a pilot at the KVP (quasi-military) Flying School at the Bautzen flying centre, which later became the Officers' Training Base for Military Pilots.   Between 1954 and 1955 he was sent on assignment as Senior Navigator of the forerunner organisation for East Germany's Airforce Command.   In this connection he was then sent for a lengthy period of training, which lasted till 1959, at the Gagarin Air Force Academy near Moscow.

Military career
From 1959 till 1961 Henkes served as a senior pilot with Airforce Command.   Then, from 1961 till 1975, he was deputy Chief of Staff for Flight Safety, Command Posts and Automation, still with Airforce Command, now based at Barnim military complex at Strausberg. During this time he was also, in 1967, awarded a doctorate in Military sciences from the Dresden Military Academy.

On 1 March 1975 he was promoted to the rank of Major General.   This was also the year in which he was succeeded as deputy Chief of Staff by Günter Hiemann and appointed a member of the government as Deputy Minister of Transport and Head of the Civil Aviation department in succession to Paul Wilpert.

In 1978 Henkes succeeded Kurt Diedrich in the top job at Interflug, the German Democratic Republic's "flag-carrier" airline.   The appointment to this position of a military general highlighted the close links between Interflug and the defense forces in East Germany.   He remained at Interflug till 1982.   On 2 October 1982 he was promoted again, now to the rank of Lieutenant general.

Retirement
In 1989 he was awarded the National Prize of East Germany, and he was retired on 30 April 1990.   He was also granted an invalidity pension.

See also
List of East German Airforce Generals

References

Lieutenant generals of the Air Forces of the National People's Army
Socialist Unity Party of Germany members
Government ministers of East Germany
Recipients of the National Prize of East Germany
Recipients of the Patriotic Order of Merit
People from Görlitz
1929 births
2003 deaths